"Could You Please Oblige Us with a Bren Gun?" is a humorous song written and composed by Noël Coward in 1941.

Like much of Coward's work it displays skill at wordplay and evokes a feeling of both good humour and patriotic pride. The song pokes fun at the disorder and shortages of equipment, supplies and effective leadership that the Home Guard experienced during the Second World War.

The dog in Three Men in a Boat, an 1889 work by Jerome K. Jerome, is named Montmorency, the surname of the colonel in the song.

The subject of the song, the Bren light machine gun, was in high demand  and short supply in wartime Britain, especially in 1941, when the British military was still recovering from the massive loss of materiel and supplies at Dunkirk. First priority was given to the British Army and Royal Marines, with the result that the units of the Home Guard, the very last line of defence, were quite unlikely to get one. As a result, members of the Home Guard often had to make do with whatever they could get their hands on- frequently old and outdated weapons.

"Could You Please Oblige Us with a Bren Gun?" is available on several compilation albums and box sets of Coward's songs. Graham Payn, Coward's longtime companion and literary executor, related that the post-war generation found an appreciation for the song after watching the British television series Dad's Army, which found humour in the same subject: the exploits of the Home Guard. Indeed, the song was later featured in the West End stage show of the television programme. It was also performed by some of the cast in a BBC Noël Coward special – the performance appears as a special feature on the DVD Dad's Army: The Christmas Specials.

References

Songs written by Noël Coward
1941 songs
Comedy songs
Songs of World War II